Dicyrtominae is a subfamily of globular springtails in the family Dicyrtomidae. There are at least 3 genera and 30 described species in Dicyrtominae.

Genera
 Calvatomina 
 Dicyrtoma Bourlet, 1841
 Dicyrtomina Börner, 1903

References

Collembola
Arthropod subfamilies